Moschen may refer to:
Mroczno
Moszna, Opole Voivodeship
Michael Moschen